Prangli Landscape Conservation Area is a nature park which is located in Harju County, Estonia.

The area of the nature park is 135 ha.

The protected area was founded in 1981 to protect forest on  Prangli island and smaller nearby island Aksi. In 1999, the protected area was designated to the landscape conservation area.

References

Nature reserves in Estonia
Geography of Harju County